The 2019 Texas A&M Aggies football team represented Texas A&M University in the 2019 NCAA Division I FBS football season. The Aggies played their home games at Kyle Field in College Station, Texas, and competed in the Western Division of the Southeastern Conference (SEC). They were led by second-year head coach Jimbo Fisher.

Preseason

SEC media poll
The SEC media poll was released on July 19, 2019 with the Aggies predicted to finish in third place in the West Division.

Preseason All-SEC teams
To be released

Coaching staff

Schedule
Texas A&M announced its 2019 football schedule on September 18, 2018. The 2019 schedule consists of 7 home, 4 away, and 1 neutral game in the regular season.

Game summaries

Texas State

Statistics

at Clemson

Statistics

Lamar

Statistics

Auburn

Statistics

vs. Arkansas

Statistics

Alabama

Statistics

at Ole Miss

Statistics

Mississippi State

Statistics

UTSA

Statistics

South Carolina

Statistics

at Georgia

Statistics

at LSU

Statistics

vs. Oklahoma State (Texas Bowl)

Statistics

Rankings

Players drafted into the NFL

References

Texas AandM
Texas A&M Aggies football seasons
Texas Bowl champion seasons
Texas AandM Aggies football